In stable homotopy theory, a branch of mathematics, the sphere spectrum S is the monoidal unit in the category of spectra. It is the suspension spectrum of S0, i.e., a set of two points. Explicitly, the nth space in the sphere spectrum is the n-dimensional sphere Sn, and the structure maps from the suspension of Sn to Sn+1 are the canonical homeomorphisms. The k-th homotopy group of a sphere spectrum is the k-th stable homotopy group of spheres.

See also 

 Chromatic homotopy theory
 Adams-Novikov spectral sequence
Framed cobordism

References

Algebraic topology
Homotopy theory